Leucocercops dasmophora is a moth of the family Gracillariidae. It is known from South Africa.

The larvae feed on Parinari capensis. They probably mine the leaves of their host plant.

References

Endemic moths of South Africa
Acrocercopinae
Moths of Africa
Moths described in 1908